Crooked Lake may refer to any of the following lakes in Nova Scotia:

In the Municipality of Clare:
Crooked Lake at 

In the District of Guysborough:
Crooked Lake at 

In Halifax Regional Municipality:
Crooked Lake at 
Crooked Lake at 
Crooked Lake at 
Crooked Lake at 
Crooked Lake at 
Crooked Lakes at 

In Kings County:
Crooked Lake at 

In District of Lunenburg:
Crooked Lake at 

In Richmond County:
Crooked Lake at

References
Geographical Names Board of Canada
Explore HRM
Nova Scotia Placenames

Lakes, Crooked Lake
Nova Scotia